Anicia Peters is a Namibian computer scientist specializing in human–computer interaction (HCI). She is the CEO of the National Commission of Research, Science and Technology (NCRST).

Early life and education
Peters was born in Rehoboth, Namibia, and attended Origo Primary School. Her family moved to the Khomasdal suburb of Windhoek when she was about 8; there, she attended M.H. Greeff Primary School and later Concordia College.

Peters earned two undergraduate degrees cum laude from the Namibia University of Science and Technology, formerly known as Polytechnic of Namibia; one was the National Diploma in Business Computing and the other was a B.Tech. in Business Computing.  For her B.Tech. degree, she earned the Rector's Medal for outstanding achievement and the Prof. Yrjö Neuvo Award for the best graduate in information technology at the institution.

Peters then studied at Iowa State University, obtaining a MSc and a PhD in human–computer interaction. She received two scholarship awards in 2013 from Boeing for contribution to HCI research conference publications. For her PhD, she received a Research Excellence Award from Iowa State University. She completed her PhD under a Fulbright International Science and Technology Award and a Schlumberger Faculty for the Future Women in Science fellowship. Her current research work is on social computing, gender in digital technologies, gamification, and e-participation such as e-government and e-health.

In 2012, she became a Google Anita Borg scholar in the United States. She also interned at Intuit in the Silicon Valley as user experience (UX) researcher prior to accepting a postdoctoral fellowship at Oregon State University. Here, she worked under Margaret Burnett, who co-founded the area of end-user software engineering and developed two visual programming languages.

Academic career

In 2015, Anicia Peters became Executive Dean of the Faculty of Computing and Informatics (FCI) and an associate professor in computer science at the Namibia University of Science and Technology (NUST), the first  Namibian dean at NUST, where she where she contributed to establishing the India-Namibia Centre of Excellence in IT.

In Namibia, she started several initiatives such as the Namibia Women in Computing conference and three chapters of the Association for Computing Machinery (ACM). One such local chapter is the ACM-W. She further chaired the International Culture and Computer Science Conference in Windhoek in October 2016. She also initiated and co-chaired the inaugural Africa Human Computer Interaction Conference (AfriCHI) in Nairobi, Kenya, in November 2016 and served as special advisor to AfriCHI2018. In 2016, Peters was made Star Of The Week by the New Era newspaper highlighting her work in academia and research.

In February 2017, she was featured as one of 20 prominent personalities in Who's Who Namibia 2017. She is also one of 10 African Women Rolemodels in Technology featured by Afchix.

From 2020 until her appointment as CEO of the NCRST, Peters served as the Pro-Vice Chancellor for Research, Innovation and Development at the University of Namibia, where she was responsible for overseeing the university's research and innovation activities. 

In July 2021, was appointed by President Hage Geingob (President of Namibia) as the Chairperson of the Namibia Presidential Task Force on the Fourth Industrial Revolution.

Since December 2022 she has been the CEO of the National Commission of Research, Science and Technology. (NCRST)

Peters has served as the vice chair of the board of directors of the Namibia Qualifications Authority and as a member of the Namibia Council for Higher Education (NCHE). President Hage Geingob appointed Peters as the chairperson of the Task Force on the Fourth Industrial Revolution for Namibia in July 2021.

Peters is married with four children.

References

Further reading

External links
Webpage at NUST

Anicia Peters at AfChix

Human–computer interaction researchers
Namibian computer scientists
Namibian women computer scientists
People from Rehoboth, Namibia
People from Windhoek
Namibia University of Science and Technology alumni
Academic staff of the Namibia University of Science and Technology
Iowa State University alumni
Living people
Deans (academic)
Women deans (academic)
Namibian expatriates in the United States
1972 births
Academic staff of the University of Namibia